Acacia scirpifolia is a shrub or tree of the genus Acacia and the subgenus Phyllodineae that is endemic to western Australia

Description
It blooms from August to October and produces yellow flowers. The inflorescences are found on racemes in groups of three to six.

Taxonomy
The species was first formally described by the botanist Carl Meissner in 1855 as part of the work Botanische Zeitung. It was reclassified as Racosperma scirpifolium in 2003 by Leslie Pedley then transferred back to genus Acacia in 2006. The species is often confused with Acacia restiacea.

Distribution
It is native to an area in the Mid West and Wheatbelt regions of Western Australia where it grows in gravelly sandy soils. It is found from the Cooloomia Nature Reserve in the north down to around Moora in the south and is often situated on road-verges.

See also
 List of Acacia species

References

scirpifolia
Acacias of Western Australia
Plants described in 1855
Taxa named by Carl Meissner